Francis Harding may refer to:

Francis Appleton Harding, Massachusetts politician

Francis Pym Harding, British army officer